Yankuba Minteh (born 22 July 2004) is a Gambian professional footballer who plays as a winger for OB.

Club career
Minteh started his career at Steve Biko in The Gambia. In the summer of 2022 he moved to Danish club OB. He made his Danish Superliga debut on 10 September 2022 in a 2–1 win against Copenhagen and scored the winning goal just three minutes after coming on as a substitute for Franco Tongya.

International career 
On 4 November 2022, Toney Minteh his first call up to the Gambia national team for the friendly matches against DR Congo and Liberia.

References

External links
 OB profile
 

2004 births
Living people
Gambian footballers
Gambian expatriate footballers
Association football forwards
Danish Superliga players
Odense Boldklub players